The Infrastructure and Energy Committee of the African Union's Economic, Social and Cultural Council is responsible for: Energy, Transport, Communications, Infrastructure and Tourism.

The Chairperson of the Committee is Gowtam Raj Chintaram of Mauritius while the Secretary is Patson Malisa of South Africa.

Sectoral Cluster Committees of the Economic, Social and Cultural Council